Hussain Ahmed (born 6 June 1989) is an Emirati professional basketball player. He currently plays for Al Shabab Dubai of the UAE National Basketball League.

He represented the UAE's national basketball team at the 2011 FIBA Asia Championship in Wuhan, China, where he was the team's best free throw shooter.

References

External links
 FIBA Profile
 Asia-basket.com Profile

1989 births
Living people
Emirati men's basketball players
People from Abu Dhabi
Point guards